Zeiko Troy Jahmiko Lewis (born 4 June 1994) is a Bermudian footballer who plays for USL Championship club Sacramento Republic FC and the Bermuda national team.

Career

Youth and college 
Lewis was born in Spanish Point, Bermuda, where he was raised by his mother, Nicole, and father, Tory.  He began his footballing career with the Dandy Town Hornets youth setup. Working his way up the academy, he moved to the United States, where he attended the Berkshire School in Sheffield, Massachusetts. During his freshman year at Berkshire, Lewis tallied a team-high eight goals and eight assists, which led to a national call up by Bermuda's under-17 national team.

After gradual improvement, Lewis had an explosive senior season, tallying 33 goals. The success led to being named an NSCAA All-American as a senior scored a goal in the High School All-American Game. Lewis was the only player from Massachusetts invited to the game, and one of three from New England.

Lewis also spent two seasons with Bermuda Hogges in the USL Premier Development League. He also played for Real Boston Rams.

His success at Berkshire landed him a scholarship with Boston College. In his freshman year with the Eagles, Lewis led the team with 17 points, and led the team in assists, with 11. He was tied for second in goals during the season. He also won the 2013 ACC Men's Soccer Freshman of the Year award.

New York Red Bulls
Ahead of the 2017 MLS SuperDraft, Lewis signed a senior college contract with Major League Soccer. He was selected 17th overall in the 2017 MLS SuperDraft by the New York Red Bulls. Per league policy the terms were not disclosed. On April 1, 2017 Lewis made his professional debut for New York Red Bulls II, scoring the lone goal in a 1–0 victory over Richmond Kickers.

Charleston Battery
After spending a season in Iceland, Lewis returned to the United States by signing with the Charleston Battery of USL Championship on 7 February 2019. In January 2020 it was announced that Lewis will remain with The Battery for the 2020 season.

Sacramento Republic FC
Lewis signed with Sacramento Republic FC on 22 December 2021.

International 
Lewis received his first international cap for Bermuda on September 2, 2011. He came on as a 77th-minute substitute for Nahki Wells in a 1–0 loss to Trinidad and Tobago in a World Cup qualifier.

International goals
Scores and results list Bermuda's goal tally first.

Honours
Bermuda
Men's Football at the Island Games: 2013

References

External links
 
 Boston College profile
 

1995 births
Living people
People from Pembroke Parish
Association football forwards
Bermudian footballers
Bermuda international footballers
Boston College Eagles men's soccer players
Bermuda Hogges F.C. players
Charleston Battery players
New York Red Bulls players
New York Red Bulls II players
Fimleikafélag Hafnarfjarðar players
Real Boston Rams players
Sacramento Republic FC players
Bermudian expatriate footballers
Expatriate soccer players in the United States
Expatriate footballers in Iceland
New York Red Bulls draft picks
USL League Two players
USL Championship players
Bermudian expatriate sportspeople in the United States
2019 CONCACAF Gold Cup players
Berkshire School alumni